"Morning Desire" is a song written by Dave Loggins, and recorded by American country music artist Kenny Rogers.  It was released in October 1985 as the lead single from the album, The Heart of the Matter.  The song was Rogers' twelfth number one on the country chart as a solo artist.  The single went to number one for one week and spent a total of fourteen weeks on the country chart. Guitarist Stanley Jordan played lead guitar on the track.

Chart performance

References

1985 singles
1985 songs
Kenny Rogers songs
Songs written by Dave Loggins
RCA Records singles
Song recordings produced by George Martin